Heping (postal: Hoping; , Hakka:Fò-phìn) is a county of northeastern Guangdong Province, China, bordering Jiangxi to the north. It is under the administration of Heyuan City. At the 2010 census, its population was around 300,000, with the majority of the residents being Hakka.

Language
As in the great majority of Heyuan county, Hakka Chinese is spoken, with residents calling their local dialect Heping hua.

Climate

References

 
County-level divisions of Guangdong
Heyuan